Jim Collins (born September 8, 1966) is an American college football coach and former player. He is currently head football coach at Wittenberg University in Springfield, Ohio, a position he has held since the 2022 season. Collins served as head football coach at the University of Dubuque in Dubuque, Iowa from 1994 to 1996, Capital University in Bexley, Ohio from 1997 to 2007, and Saginaw Valley State University in University Center, Michigan from 2008 to 2018. He wasthe director of player personnel for the Army Black Knights of the United States Military Academy in 2019 and he offensive coordinator and quarterbacks coach for the Dayton Flyers from 2020 to 2021.

Coaching career
Collins is currently the Head Coach for the Wittenberg Tigers. He is the former Offensive Coordinator/Quarterbacks Coach for Dayton and the Director of Player Personnel for the Army Black Knights football program, being announced for the position by the West Point Athletics Department on March 19, 2019.

His previous position was as the head football coach at Saginaw Valley State University in University Center, Michigan.  Saginaw Valley made the playoffs three times during Collins' tenure (2009, 2011, and 2013).  Prior to that as the head football coach at Capital University, Collins recorded 66 wins and 51 losses in 11 seasons, which ranks him second all time in wins and second in all-time winning percentage (.564) for the school.  Capital made the NCAA Division III playoffs in each of Collins' last three seasons.

Head coaching record

Football

References

External links
 Wittenberg profile
 Dayton profile
 Army profile
 Saginaw Valley State profile

1966 births
Living people
American football wide receivers
Army Black Knights football coaches
Capital Comets football coaches
Central Michigan Chippewas football coaches
Dayton Flyers football coaches
Dubuque Spartans football coaches
Illinois Wesleyan Titans football coaches
Saginaw Valley State Cardinals football coaches
Wittenberg Tigers football coaches
Wittenberg Tigers football players
Sportspeople from Buffalo, New York
Players of American football from Buffalo, New York